Enrique González (or Quique González) may refer to:

Musicians
Enrique González "La Pulga" (1890–1957), Cuban singer-songwriter
Enrique González Mántici (1912–1974), Cuban violinist, first director of Orquesta Riverside
Quique González (singer) (born 1973), Spanish singer-songwriter

Politicians
Enrique González Pedrero (born 1930), Mexican politician
Enrique Parejo González (born 1930), Colombian politician
Enrique Cárdenas González (1927–2018), Mexican policition, governor of Tamaulipas from 1975 to 1981
Henry B. González (Enrique Barbosa González, 1916–2000), American politician and member of the U.S. House of Representatives

Sportsmen
Enrique González (fencer) (born 1933), Spanish Olympic fencer
Enrique González (boxer) (born 1945), Chilean Olympic boxer
Enrique Ramos González (born 1956), Spanish footballer
Enrique González (equestrian) (born 1964), Mexican Olympic equestrian
Enrique González (baseball) (born 1982), Venezuelan baseball player
Tomás González (gymnast) (born 1985), Chilean artistic gymnast, complete name Enrique Tomás González Sepúlveda
Quique González (footballer) (born 1990), Spanish footballer
Enrique González (field hockey) (born 1996), Spanish field hockey player
Enrique González (hurdler), Spanish hurdle athlete in 2012 World Junior Championships in Athletics – Men's 400 metres hurdles

Writers
Enrique González Martínez (1871–1952), Mexican poet
Enrique González Rojo Sr. (1899–1939), Mexican writer
Enrique González Rojo Jr. (born 1928), Mexican writer